Jan Edward Romer (1869 in Lwów – 1934 in Warsaw) was a Polish general and military commander. Studied in Mödling and joined the Austro-Hungarian Army. During the First World War fought at the battle of Limanowa (1914) and battle of Gorlice (1914), was wounded twice. Later he joined the newly recreated Polish Army.  During Polish-Ukrainian War he fought in the liberation of Lwów. In Polish-Soviet War, commanded the Cavalry Division at the Battle of Koziatyn (April 25-April 27, 1920), one of the most spectacular raids of the Polish cavalry, during the Polish advance towards Kiev. His troops fought against the Soviet cavalry elite Konarmia of Semyon Budyonny. He commanded the Polish 13th Infantry Division during the Battle of Komarów (August 31, 1920). Respected by Józef Piłsudski, he was among the first group military personas who confirmed the decoration of Virtuti Militari, highest Polish military decoration, restored after the recreation of the Second Polish Republic, and he himself received the Commander's Cross of that award. Held position of Inspector of the Army after the war. Buried in Powązki Cemetery in Warsaw.

Honours and awards
 Commander's Cross of the Virtuti Militari, also awarded the Silver Cross
 Commander's Cross with Star of the Order of Polonia Restituta (1930), also awarded the Commander's Cross
 Cross of Valour - four times
 Gold Cross of Merit

References

External links
  Short biography

1869 births
1934 deaths
Polish generals
Burials at Powązki Cemetery
Commanders of the Virtuti Militari
Commanders with Star of the Order of Polonia Restituta
Recipients of the Cross of Valour (Poland)
Recipients of the Gold Cross of Merit (Poland)
Polish Austro-Hungarians
Military personnel from Lviv